The third generation of iPad Pro is a line of tablet computers designed, developed and marketed by Apple Inc. Two models, with a 12.9 inch or 11 inch screen, were both announced on October 30, 2018, and were available to purchase on November 7. This generation of iPad Pro was the first iPad compatible with the new (second generation) Apple Pencil stylus. Like the second generation, a larger size and stylus compatibility were a point of difference from the rest of Apple's available iPads, but the third generation iPad Pro was also the first iPad to use facial recognition (Face ID) to unlock the device.

Upgrades from the second generation iPad Pro include the more powerful A12X Bionic processor, storage capacity up to 1 terabyte and the larger display of the 11 inch model (upgraded from a 10.5 inch model). The third generation iPad Pro also premiered a new design, with a screen that covers more of the front face, and has rounded corners.

Features 
The redesigned iPad Pro was announced on October 30, 2018, during an Apple Special Event at the Howard Gilman Opera House in Brooklyn, New York. The 2018 models feature new edge-to-edge Liquid Retina displays, Face ID, improved 12 megapixel and 7 megapixel cameras, USB-C connector, and Apple A12X Bionic processors. The tablets are offered in 11-inch and 12.9-inch sizes, and are the first iPad models to offer tap-to-wake LCD displays (following the iPhone X), and up to 1 TB of internal storage. The 1 TB models featured more RAM than the smaller storage sizes with an increase to 6 GB, up from 4 GB. These devices are the first iPads to feature a USB Type-C connector, replacing Apple's proprietary Lightning connector, and the 12.9” iPad Pro gained eSIM for the first time (which had been present on all generations of the smaller 11” iPad Pros). The third-generation iPad Pro lacked a home button and a headphone jack, a first for the iPad lineup. Additionally, the tablets lack  Touch ID, which has been superseded by Face ID using a sensor array on the top bezel. Unlike iPhone models featuring Face ID until iOS 16, the third-generation iPad Pro can unlock in any orientation. The tablets were released on November 7, 2018, only available in Silver and Space Gray as the Gold and Rose Gold finishes from the previous generation have been removed. The 3rd-generation iPad Pro were notably the thinnest iPad yet at 5.9 mm thick.

Reception
The 2018 iPad Pro models were praised for their improved displays, slimmer bezels, the addition of Face ID and general speed improvements. Ben Sin from Forbes noted that although the screen is still a LCD screen, the 120 Hz refresh rate makes it feel more responsive. The switch to a USB-C connecter received a mixed response; easier external monitor support and more universal device charging were added at the cost of extra dongles to use older cables and headphones. Some reviewers noted that although the hardware updates are great steps forward, iOS's limitations, including the lack of external storage capabilities, which was addressed with the iPadOS 13 update,  prevents the iPad Pro from competing against traditional computers. The increased prices across the lineup were also criticized.

iPadOS addresses the lack of external storage on supported iPads by adding support for external storage.

The chassis has been criticized for bending and breaking easily. Users on forum boards have reported the iPad bending after a few days of use, such as after carrying it around in a backpack. YouTuber Zack Nelson then published a video on his channel JerryRigEverything showing the device cracking and snapping in half after applying just a small amount of pressure with his hands in the center of the device. Nelson concluded that the "two weakest points [were] right dead center on either side of the iPad Pro, [and] the crack happened at the very poorly placed microphone hole and the new Apple Pencil 2 charging duct". Users reported devices already bent right out of the box, mostly cellular models. Apple responded to these reports quickly, asserting that this is normal and a non-issue, a response which has been criticized by many. According to Apple, the bending is a byproduct of its new manufacturing process and within their tolerances. Apple has added a support page relating to these issues.

Timeline

See also
 Pen computing
 Graphics tablet

Notes

References

External links

Pro
iPad Pro
Tablet computers
Touchscreen portable media players
Tablet computers introduced in 2018
Foxconn